Mesosa rupta is a species of beetle in the family Cerambycidae. It was described by Francis Polkinghorne Pascoe in 1862, originally under the genus Agelasta. It is known from Vietnam, Cambodia and Laos.

References

rupta
Beetles described in 1862